The Stony Brook University Research and Development Park is a research and development park located in Stony Brook, New York owned by Stony Brook University, which acquired the land through eminent domain in 2005. The park is located a mile from the center of campus along Stony Brook Road on an area spanning over 240 acres in size.

Overview
The land was originally owned by St. James Gyrodyne Company of America and acquired by the university in a controversial eminent domain case in which the courts decided against the state's $26 million appraisal in support of the owner's $126 million valuation and later denied the state's request for appeal. The state ended up paying $167.5 million in a lawsuit settlement in 2012

The Park

Center for Excellence in Wireless and Information Technology (CEWIT)

CEWIT opened in March 2009 with over 100,000 square feet of laboratory space.

The center has over 70 associated faculty members, 190 Ph.D. and 180 MS students engaged in research at the center and obtained more than twelve patents in just the last two years. CEWIT has established partnerships with IT companies including giants like IBM and Cisco Systems and formed partnerships with other leading research institutions.

Research areas include:

The Center's research areas are diverse and cover distributed robotics, expressive and hybrid networks, mobile computing, wireless networks, cyber security, computer vision and image processing, RF systems, microwave sensors, wireless sensor networks, computational genetics and protein docking, computational neurobiology, virtual reality, effective bandwidth utilization, wireless protocols, wireless ad hoc networks and wireless gateways.

Advanced Energy Center

Innovation and Discovery Center

References

Stony Brook University